Biwi-O-Biwi (Hindi: बीवी-ओ-बीवी) is a 1981 romantic-comedy Hindi movie. Produced by Raj Kapoor and directed by Rahul Rawail. The film stars Sanjeev Kumar, Randhir Kapoor, Poonam Dhillon and Yogeeta Bali. The film's music is by R. D. Burman. The movie was commercially successful.

Cast 
Sanjeev Kumar as Colonel Mangal Singh / Shankar / Commander Chatur Singh
Randhir Kapoor as Chandermohan "Chander"
Poonam Dhillon as Asha Singh
Yogeeta Bali as Reena
Simi Garewal as Nisha
Deven Verma as Gafoor
Shashikala as Nirmala 
Prema Narayan as Rita
Rajendra Nath as Veer Singh
Hari Shivdasani as Colonel Hari Singh
Dina Pathak as Mrs. Singh
Sunder as Girdhari
Dulari as Chander's Mother

Uncredited Special Appearance 
Prithviraj Kapoor as himself (Ritual Performed In The Beginning) (Voice) (Archive Footage)
Shammi Kapoor as Campa Cola Truck Driver 
Rishi Kapoor as Singing man In Hotel Corridor 
Om Prakash as Chander's Father

Music

Track listing 
vitthalbhai Patel write the song "Waqt Se Pehle". Rest of the songs were written by Nida Fazli.

References

External links 
 

1980s Hindi-language films
Films scored by R. D. Burman
Indian films with live action and animation
Films directed by Rahul Rawail